Samuel Wilson Boyd (born 1886 or 1887) was a unionist politician in Northern Ireland.

Boyd studied at Campbell College in Belfast, then worked as a distiller.  He joined the Ulster Unionist Party, and was elected to the Senate of Northern Ireland in 1955, serving until his resignation in 1962.  He was a Deputy Speaker of the Senate from 1959 to 1962.

References

1880s births
Year of death missing
Members of the Senate of Northern Ireland 1953–1957
Members of the Senate of Northern Ireland 1957–1961
People educated at Campbell College
Ulster Unionist Party members of the Senate of Northern Ireland